The 1985–86 Villanova Wildcats men's basketball team represented Villanova University in the 1985–86 season.  The head coach was Rollie Massimino.  The team played its home games at The Pavilion in Villanova, Pennsylvania, and was a member of the Big East Conference.

Previous season 
Villanova finished the regular season tied for third place in the Big East standings. In the conference tournament, the Wildcats defeated Pittsburgh in the quarterfinal round before losing to St. John's in the semifinals. The team was awarded an at-large bid to the NCAA tournament as No. 8 seed in the Southeast region. After escaping the opening round with a 2-point win over Dayton, Villanova knocked off No. 1 seed Michigan, No. 5 seed Maryland, and No. 2 seed North Carolina to reach the Final Four. They shut down Memphis State in the National Semifinals, while Georgetown handled St. John's in the other National semifinal. The Wildcats played a near perfect game to defeat the Hoyas in the championship game, 66–64. As of the 2021–22 season, Villanova is the only No. 8 seed to win the National championship.

Roster

Schedule and results

|-
!colspan=9 style=| Non-Conference Regular Season

|-
!colspan=9 style=| Big East Regular Season

|-
!colspan=9 style=| Big East tournament

|-
!colspan=9 style=| NCAA tournament

Players in the 1986 NBA Draft

References 

Villanova Wildcats men's basketball seasons
Villanova
Villanova
Villanova
Villanova